Harmony Speedway was a racing venue in Warren County, New Jersey, which opened on June 7, 1963 and closed in 1975.

References

External links
Harmony Speedway Memories

1963 establishments in New Jersey
1975 disestablishments in New Jersey
Defunct motorsport venues in the United States
Motorsport venues in New Jersey
Warren County, New Jersey
Sports venues completed in 1963